Luciano Chiarugi (born 13 January 1947) is an Italian football manager and former player who played as a forward.

Club career

Born in Ponsacco, Province of Pisa, Chiarugi started his career with Fiorentina, being part of the lineup that won the 1968–69 Serie A title. After seven seasons with the viola, Chiarugi moved to A.C. Milan in 1972, being instrumental to the rossoneri triumph in the 1972–73 European Cup Winners' Cup, won thanks to a goal by him in the final match against Leeds United, finishing the competition as top scorer.

In 1976, he was sold to Napoli in an exchange bid with Giorgio Braglia, with whom he shared the same nickname: Cavallo Pazzo ("Crazy" or "Mad Horse", in Italian). He played two seasons with the azzurri, winning a Coppa Italia and an Anglo-Italian Cup. He played for Serie B team Sampdoria in 1978–79, and then back to Serie A with Bologna the following season. After spells with minor league teams Rimini, Rondinella and Massese, Chiarugi retired from football in 1986.

International career
Chiarugi also gained three caps for the Italy national football team, making his debut on 22 November 1969 in a 3–0 win over East Germany.

Style of play

Known in Italian football for his impetuous nature, pace and technique, which gained him the nickname Cavallo Pazzo (Crazy Horse), Chiarugi was a quick, energetic, and highly creative forward with an eye for goal and excellent dribbling skills, known for his individualistic playing style, as well as his use of elaborate feints and nutmegs to beat opponents. He was also known for his accurate striking and crossing ability, and was effective from set-pieces; this allowed him to play both as a striker, or as a winger on either flank. However, despite his talent, he was also popularly considered as a diver, causing the Italian media to create the Italian neologism chiarugismo, a synonym of "football diving", after his name.

Coaching career
After his retirement as a player in 1986, Chiarugi joined the Fiorentina youth team coaching staff. In his career, he served as Fiorentina's Caretaker manager three times. Late into the 1992–93 season, Chiarugi (jointly with Giancarlo Antognoni) replaced Aldo Agroppi with little fortune, as he did not manage to save them from relegation to Serie B after 54 consecutive seasons in the top flight. In February 2001, following the dismissal of Fatih Terim, Chiarugi was installed as caretaker coach for a single match, a 2–1 loss to Bari, before the appointment of Roberto Mancini. Following the departure of Ottavio Bianchi, Chiarugi was appointed again as caretaker coach during the dramatic 2001–02 season, which ended with relegation to Serie B and the successive club cancellation due to financial troubles, which ultimately led to Fiorentina's bankruptcy.

On 14 November 2007, he was announced as the new head coach of Tuscan Serie C2 side Poggibonsi. He was sacked in September 2008 due to poor results.

Honours

Club
Fiorentina
 Coppa Italia: 1965–66
 Mitropa Cup: 1965–66
 Serie A: 1968–69

Milan
 Coppa Italia: 1972–73
 European Cup Winners' Cup: 1972–73

Napoli
 Anglo-Italian League Cup: 1976

Individual
 UEFA Cup Winners' Cup Top Scorer: 1972–73
 Mitropa Cup Top Scorer: 1971–72
 Fiorentina Hall of Fame

References

Living people
1947 births
Sportspeople from the Province of Pisa
Association football forwards
Italian footballers
Italian football managers
Italy international footballers
Italy under-21 international footballers
ACF Fiorentina players
A.C. Milan players
S.S.C. Napoli players
U.C. Sampdoria players
Bologna F.C. 1909 players
Rimini F.C. 1912 players
U.S. Massese 1919 players
Serie A players
Serie B players
Serie C players
Serie D players
Serie A managers
ACF Fiorentina managers
Footballers from Tuscany